Ebbe Schwartz (3 May 1901 – 19 October 1964) was a Danish football administrator.

Career
 From 1950 until 1964 he was president of the Danish Football Association (the DBU).
 He served as UEFA President (1954–1962).
 From 1962 until 1964 he was a member of the executive committee and vice-president of the world football federation FIFA.

References

External links
 Ebbe Schwartz - Kendtes gravsted
 Past presidents UEFA.com
 W. Pyta, N. Havemann European Football and Collective Memory

1901 births
1964 deaths
People from Frederiksberg
Presidents of UEFA
Association football executives
Danish people of German descent